Louis Gaiennie Friedrichs (August 25, 1917 – September 18, 1985) was an American football player and coach. He served as the head football coach at St. Ambrose University in Davenport, Iowa from 1955 to 1959.

Fredrichs was a running back at the University of Oklahoma from 1938 to 1940.

References

External links
 Campion Knights profile
 

1917 births
1985 deaths
Oklahoma Sooners football players
St. Ambrose Fighting Bees football coaches
High school football coaches in Louisiana
High school football coaches in Missouri
High school football coaches in Nebraska
High school football coaches in Wisconsin
Sportspeople from New Orleans
Players of American football from New Orleans